Metro 2035 is a 2015 post-apocalyptic science fiction novel by Russian author Dmitry Glukhovsky. Glukhovsky's third book in the core Metro series, it serves as a sequel to Metro 2033 and Metro 2034. Like previous novels in the series, Metro 2035 is primarily set in the Moscow Metro and the ruins of Moscow itself in the aftermath of a nuclear apocalypse. 2035 follows Artyom, the protagonist of Metro 2033, as he attempts to make contact with other survivors in the world. Metro 2035 is partially inspired by the video game Metro: Last Light. In turn, Metro Exodus is a game loosely based on Metro 2035.

Plot
Two years after Metro 2033, Artyom has left the Spartan Order and now lives at his home station, VDNKh, with his wife Anya. Claiming to have heard a radio message in Ostankino Tower, Artyom attempts to make contact with other survivors in the world by broadcasting radio messages on the highly irradiated surface, but never receives any response. Anya considers Artyom's efforts fruitless, and his refusal to have children with her causes their relationship to deteriorate. Homer, a major character in Metro 2034, arrives at the station, wanting to learn more about Artyom's conflict with the Dark Ones so that he can write a book about it. Artyom initially refuses to help Homer, but changes his mind after Homer claims that he met a man at Teatralnaya who made radio contact with Polar Dawns, a city on the Kola Peninsula. Artyom and Homer set out towards Teatralnaya. Lyokha, a dung broker from Rizhskaya, helps them cross the border of Hansa, a capitalist faction controlling the Koltsevaya Line. The three men eventually reach Tsvetnoy Bulvar, where Artyom gets drunk and blacks out at a local brothel. Artyom, Lyokha, and Homer arrive at Tverskaya, renamed “Darwin” by the neo-Nazi Fourth Reich, and are arrested shortly afterward. A Reich officer threatens to kill Homer if Artyom refuses to bomb the passageway leading from neutral Teatralnaya to Okhotny Ryad, which is controlled by the communist Red Line. At Teatralnaya, Artyom finds the radio operator that Homer mentioned, but Red Line soldiers take the man away before Artyom can speak to him. Artyom goes to Okhotny Ryad, where the radio operator is executed, but other prisoners tell Artyom that people from outside of Moscow allegedly came to the Metro. Artyom escapes to the surface and experiences a strange vision of a fantasy Moscow.

Artyom arrives at Polis, a union of four stations and the headquarters of the Spartan Order. There, he meets with Letyaga, a Spartan friend of his, and Miller, leader of the Order and Anya's father. Miller tasks Letyaga and Artyom with delivering a message to the Reich's Führer. Artyom is allowed into the Reich after Letyaga says that the letter is actually from someone named “Bessolov”. Artyom is taken to Schiller (formerly Pushkinskaya), where he is forced to do manual labor with other Reich captives, including Homer and Lyokha. Artyom tells Homer about his visions of an alternate Moscow; Homer reveals that the visions are how Sasha, a young girl who seemingly died at the end of 2034, envisioned pre-war life. Artyom realizes that he saw a girl fitting Homer's description of Sasha at the brothel in Tsvetnoy Bulvar. One of the prisoners at Schiller reveals that a base supposedly exists on the surface at Balashikha. Artyom and Lyokha escape and return to Tsvetnoy Bulvar, where a heavily irradiated Artyom meets Sasha, now a prostitute in the service of “Bessolov”. Sasha and Artyom have a brief affair; she tells him that he likely only has three weeks to live because of his exposure to radiation. Accompanied by Lyokha and a surface explorer named Savelii, Artyom discovers the Balashikha outpost and kills the men inside. He sees what he assumes is radio equipment, but is unable to operate it and damages it in frustration. Shortly afterward, however, Savelii's car radio starts playing radio messages from around the world, revealing that the outpost contained a jammer that was blocking radio signals from being heard in Moscow. A group of men arrive at the outpost, claiming to be from Murom, where the air is breathable and crops can grow on the surface. Letyaga arrives and executes the Muromers, saying that they were spies and that the war between Russia and the West is still going on. Miller reveals that the jammer is a joint Spartan-Hansa operation, allegedly intended to prevent enemy forces from discovering that Moscow still has people living in it.

Miller accepts Artyom, Lyokha, and Savelii into the Order and tasks them with delivering ammunition to Hansa. As he is delivering the ammo, however, Artyom recognizes one of the “Hansa” men as a Red Line officer from Okhotny Ryad. The Red Line soldiers promptly use the ammo to massacre a crowd of refugees. Letyaga reveals that Miller asked him to kill Artyom, but he changes his mind and helps Artyom escape; Savelii, however, is trampled to death by the crowd. Increasingly suspicious of the role of “Bessolov”, Artyom goes to Tsvetnoy Bulvar to kill him but passes out in Sasha's room. He awakens in Tagansky Protected Command Point, a former government bunker, and has received treatment for his radiation. He speaks with Bessolov, who is a high-ranking official in the remnants of the Russian government. Bessolov reveals that he and the other members of the bunker secretly control the Metro's main factions from behind the scenes and keep people in the Metro to preserve civilization. Disgusted, Artyom asks to be taken back to the Metro, where he is informed by Sasha that the Order has captured his allies. Sasha refuses to accompany Artyom, stating that she loves Bessolov. Artyom is arrested by the Order upon his arrival in Polis. Miller arranges a comrades’ court to judge Artyom, Lyokha, and Letyaga, with Homer serving as a witness. At the court, Letyaga criticizes Miller and is shot and killed, sparking a fight. In the chaos, Artyom attempts to escape, but stays behind after Miller's men threaten to kill Anya. Homer supposedly heads to the Reich to print pamphlets telling the truth about the Metro while Lyokha travels to Tsvetnoy Bulvar to capture Bessolov. A meeting is called at Polis; the leader of Polis reveals to the people that other survivors have been detected but claims that the war is still going on, necessitating cooperation between the Metro's major factions. Lyokha arrives with Bessolov but reveals to Artyom that he has accepted an offer from Bessolov to join the bunker group. Artyom sees Homer, who admits that he never went to the Reich to print pamphlets and has instead decided to settle in Polis. Artyom and Anya escape to the surface, where they use Savelii's car to travel to VDNKh. Artyom offers to lead the people onto the surface and go to Murom, but nobody but Anya agrees to leave. Artyom and Anya leave the Metro and set off for Vladivostok, the childhood home of Anya's mother. In the afterword, Lyokha sees Artyom and Anya leaving Moscow, but Bessolov tells him to let them go.

History
Joystiq first mentioned the name of the book in an article posted on 1 March 2013. The article claimed that the book will be written by Dmitry Glukhovsky and will also be available outside of Russia. On 23 March 2013, during PAX East 2013, Glukhovsky himself detailed some of the story aspects of the video game Metro: Last Light and also revealed that he was writing a new book set in the Metro universe, titled Metro 2035, confirming the news at Joystiq. The novel was described as telling the same story as Metro: Last Light – thus once again casting Artyom as the protagonist – but in greater detail and length than the game itself. The writer stated that while writing the plot and dialogues for the game, the story outgrew the framework of a video game so he decided to write a book about it. In April 2014, Glukhovsky stated via Twitter: "The time has come to admit: Metro 2035 is in works and could be released in Russian later this year", however the book was not published in 2014 and the final release date was only to be revealed the following year. In March 2015, Glukhovsky posted an image on Instagram of working cover art for Metro 2035 and told his followers that the full print version of the novel was going to arrive in June 2015. Two months later, Glukhovsky posted the final version of the cover art on Instagram and announced that the novel is finally complete.

Starting in March 2015, chapters of Metro 2035 were published daily in the free newspaper Metro distributed in subways of the seven biggest Russian cities – starting with Saint Petersburg. On 12 June 2015 (when the book was finally published in Russia), the official website for Polish readers of Uniwersum Metro 2033 revealed that work on the Polish translation of the book was already at a very advanced stage. Insignis, the Polish publisher, aimed to release the translated version in autumn of 2015 and made good on its promise when Metro 2035 hit the shelves of Polish bookshops on 4 November 2015 – like Piter, the novel was translated from Russian to Polish by Paweł Podmiotko. By the end of the same month, a Hungarian translation by József Goretity was printed by Európa Könyvkiadó. Shortly thereafter, the author stated that an English language version of the book will not be out until 2016 at the earliest (this was later confirmed by an English cover reveal and announcement of plans to publish the translation by Christmas of 2016). The English edition finally arrived in early December 2016.

Reception

References

2015 science fiction novels
Fiction set in 2035
21st-century Russian novels
Metro 2033
Novels based on video games
Novels set in Moscow
Post-apocalyptic novels
Russian science fiction novels
Sequel novels